Pennisetia is a genus of moths in the family Sesiidae.

Species
Pennisetia bohemica Králícek & Povolný, 1974
Pennisetia fixseni (Leech, 1889)
Pennisetia fixseni fixseni (Leech, 1889)
Pennisetia fixseni admirabilis Arita, 1992
Pennisetia hylaeiformis (Laspeyres, 1801)
Pennisetia hylaeiformis hylaeiformis (Laspeyres, 1801)
Pennisetia hylaeiformis assimilis Arita, 1992
Pennisetia insulicola Arita 1992
Pennisetia pectinata (Staudinger 1887)
Pennisetia marginata (Harris 1839)
Pennisetia eucheripennis (Boisduval, [1875])
Pennisetia contracta (Walker, 1856)
Pennisetia fujianensis Wang & Yang, 2002
Pennisetia kumaoides Arita & Gorbunov, 2001
Pennisetia unicingulata Arita & Gorbunov, 2001

References

Sesiidae